The Dongseongno Festival is a festival held in  Daegu Jung-gu, South Korea.  The festival is held every May and includes a song festival, a fashion show, and concerts.

The Dongsang-ro Festival, which opened its doors in May 1990, has established itself as one of the most successful models of the festival led by the pure private sector. The festival is a leading business district in Korea and will be the venue for the festival to showcase the excellence of culture with people around the world in Daegu Youth Street.

See also

List of music festivals in South Korea

References

See also
List of festivals in South Korea
List of festivals in Asia

External links
   

Cultural festivals in South Korea
Arts festivals in South Korea
Tourist attractions in Daegu
Annual events in South Korea
Music festivals in South Korea
Festivals in Daegu
Spring (season) events in South Korea
Festivals established in 1990
1990 establishments in South Korea